Zhang Shuai was defending champion, but withdrew with a right arm injury before the tournament.

Monica Niculescu won the title, defeating Alizé Cornet in the final 6–4, 6–0.

Seeds

Draw

Finals

Top half

Bottom half

Qualifying

Seeds

Qualifiers

Qualifying draw

First qualifier

Second qualifier

Third qualifier

Fourth qualifier

Fifth qualifier

Sixth qualifier

References
Main Draw
Qualifying Draw

2014 Singles
Guangzhou International Women's Open Singles
Guangzhou International Women's Open Singles